Tuula Yrjölä is a Finnish diplomat. She is the  Head of the OSCE  Office in Tajikistan of the Organization for Security and Cooperation in Europe since 1 October 2016, where she was appointed by the OSCE Presidency in 2016. She was the Ambassador of Finland to Cairo  from 2013 to 2016. She started working at the Ministry for Foreign Affairs since 1982.

Yrjölä has previously served as a rotating Ambassador of Central Asia and Head of the Unit for Eastern Europe and Central Asia and served in the Finnish Missions in New York, Moscow and Kyiv.

References

 
Ambassadors of Finland to Egypt
Living people
Year of birth missing (living people)
Finnish women ambassadors